Périgordian is a term for several distinct but related Upper Palaeolithic cultures which are thought by some archaeologists to represent a contiguous tradition. Thought to have existed between c.35,000 BP and c.20,000 BP the Perigordian was theorized by prehistorians (namely ).

The earliest culture in the tradition is the Châtelperronian which is thought to have produced denticulate tools and flint knives. It is argued that this was superseded by the Gravettian with its Font Robert points and Noailles burins. The tradition culminated in the proto-Magdalenian. 

Critics have pointed out that no continuous sequence of Périgordian occupation has yet been found, and that the tradition requires it to have co-existed separately from the Aurignacian industry rather than being differing industries that existed before and afterwards.

Sites
Font-Robert - (Jalón). Périgordia V.
Gorge d'Enfer - (Dordogne). Lower and Upper Périgordia.
La Ferrassie - (Dordogne).
La Gravette - (Dordogne). Périgordia IV.
Labattut (Abri) - (Dordogne). Périgordia IV-VI.
Laugerie Haute - (Dordogne).
Laussel - (Dordogne) Périgordia IV.
Le Moustier - (Dordogne).
Noailles - (Corrèze). Périgord V.
Oreille d'Enfer - (Dordogne). Périgord V.
Abri Pataud - (Dordogne). Périgord IV-VII.
Vignaud (Abri) - (Dordogne). Périgord V.

References

Further reading
Aubarbier, Jean-Luc; Binet, Michel; Guichard, Genevieve. Aimer la Préhistoire en Périgord. Éditions Ouest-France, Rennes 1991. 
Delluc, Brigitte; Delluc, Gilles; Roussot, Alain; Roussot-Larroque, Julia. Connaître la préhistoire en Périgord. Éditions Sud-Ouest, Bordeaux, 1990.

External links
Archeology Wordsmith

Aurignacian
Upper Paleolithic cultures of Europe
Archaeological cultures in France
Industries (archaeology)